B. V. Covert and Company was a manufacturer of automobiles in Lockport, New York, from 1901 to 1907.  The company started as a manufacturer of steam-powered cars, but later switched to gas-powered vehicles.  Some Coverts were exported to England as Covert-Jacksons.

History

The 1904 Covert was a small, inexpensive touring car model.  It could seat two passengers and sold for US$750.  The vertically mounted single-cylinder engine, situated at the front of the car, produced 6 hp (4.5 kW).  A two-speed sliding transmission was fitted.  The angle iron-framed car weighed 750 lb (340 kg).  It was one of the least expensive conventional touring cars on the market, but used the modern Système Panhard found on much more full-featured cars from Europe.

See also
 List of defunct United States automobile manufacturers
 Brass Era car

Advertisements

References

 Frank Leslie's Popular Monthly (January, 1904)

Cars introduced in 1901
Defunct motor vehicle manufacturers of the United States
Defunct companies based in New York (state)
Vehicle manufacturing companies established in 1901
Vehicle manufacturing companies disestablished in 1907
1900s cars
Veteran vehicles
1901 establishments in New York (state)
1907 disestablishments in New York (state)